The Marienlyst Stadion has been the home ground of Strømsgodset Toppfotball since 1967. It's located on Marienlyst in Drammen, Norway.

History
The pitch was opened in 1924, and was the home ground of Drafn, Skiold and Drammens BK. The final of the 1932 Norwegian Football Cup, between Fredrikstad and Ørn was played at Marienlyst. During the 1952 Winter Olympics in neighboring Oslo, the venue hosted two ice hockey matches. The venue hosted the Norwegian Athletics Championships in 1962 and 2001. The Norway national under-21 football team has played eighteen games Marienlyst, making it their most-used venue. The first under-21 match was played in 1981.

After a rebuild of the south end in 2014, and installation of safe standing seats, the stadium has a capacity of 8,935. When using the seats, the capacity is 8,060. 
The rebuild was done to ensure that the stadium would fulfill UEFA's regulations for a Category 4 stadium, which can be used for all Champions League or Europa League matches except the final.

The grass was removed in November 2007 to make way for artificial ice surface for winter sports, and artificial grass for summer sports. A new stadium was planned, but the project was abandoned due to financial difficulties. There are new plans to expand and rebuild the main stand. In a 2012 survey carried out by the Norwegian Players' Association among away-team captains, Marienlyst was ranked third-worst amongst league stadiums, with a score of 2.13 on a scale from one to five. This was mainly due to the worn-out artificial turf, which was replaced in the summer of 2013.

The Gamle Gress (old Turf) is part of a sport complex, with the adjacent bandy field (artificial ice) and the athletics stadium next door as well as the sports hall for indoor athletics and handball.

Attendance
The record attendance is 17,300 when Mjøndalen met Viking in the semifinal of the 1947 Norwegian Football Cup. Strømsgodset's record attendance is from 22 May 1969, when 16,687 people attended the home match against Rosenborg.

Strømsgodset's league attendances

This lists Strømsgodsets's most recent average league home attendances at Marienlyst. It also lists minimum and maximum league homeattendances from each season.

References

1952 Winter Olympics official report. pp. 31–2.

External links

 Marienlyst Stadion - Nordic Stadiums
 StadiumDB.com profile

Venues of the 1952 Winter Olympics
Football venues in Norway
Eliteserien venues
Norwegian Cup Final venues
Athletics (track and field) venues in Norway
Event venues established in 1924
1924 establishments in Norway
Strømsgodset Toppfotball
Olympic ice hockey venues
Sports venues in Viken
Ice hockey venues in Norway